Songs from the Red Room is the fourth studio album by British pop-rock project Shakespears Sister, released in November 2009 through SF Records.

Background 
Songs from the Red Room was originally planned for release in 2005, under Siobhan Fahey's own name and the title Bad Blood. This release never came to surface however, and was only released four years later as Shakespears Sister, after Fahey revived the project the same year. On 11 May 2010, the album was re-released containing a bonus disc for the first time through major retailers, such as Amazon.

Critical reception 

Jaime Gill of BBC Music gave Songs from the Red Room a positive review, praising Fahey's musical creativity yet also criticising the album's long-delayed release, saying "Songs From the Red Room often sounds dated, and unfashionably late to the party when it should have been first." (S)he concluded the review with calling the album "inconsistent, haphazard, dark and occasionally touched by pop genius. Rather like Fahey herself, in fact." Simon Gage of the Daily Express panned the album in his short review, saying "this second outing, without Marcella, is quite another kettle of fish, so wilfully avant-garde in a way Goldfrapp did much better (and earlier) that it makes you dream of the original SS. Or better still, Bananarama." Iain Moffat of The Fly noted both the album and Fahey's musical variety, opening "Post-punk pop goddess, neo-glam eccentric, nu-electro siren… Siobhan Fahey's been many things in her time, but never all of them on the same album before."

Simon Price of The Independent doubted Fahey's intentions behind crediting the album as "Shakespears Sister", but also said "[Fahey's] spiky electro-rock has its moments, notably "Was It Worth It", which reunites Fahey with Terry Hall for the first time since those Fun Boy Three and Bananarama days." Ben Hogwood of musicOMH, whilst noting Marcella Detroit being voted off Popstar to Operastar, said that "Good though Detroit is, it's Fahey who provided a lot of the attitude in the duo – and listening to this album, much that has been good about Shakespears Sister remains." He heavily criticised the album's lack of consistency, saying "What stops this album from ultimately achieving that revenge is its lack of a common voice", but went on to call Fahey a "fiercely creative force." Luke Turner of NME noted the album's difference in sound, saying "The histrionics of [Stay] are replaced by nail-scratch electronics, Siobhan Fahey's voice flapping above turrets of synths manned by robots in pointy brassieres. It's a slightly kitsch success."

Jude Rogers of The Quietus gave the album a positive and lengthy review, citing Shakespears Sister's history and success with "Stay", and reviewing each individual track and how they worked within the whole album, highlighting "A Loaded Gun" as 
"terrifying and poppy" and going on to lament that "Fahey will always be remembered for the song that destroyed her, and not the career that should have followed it, and the drive that should have made her a pioneering artist. For now, we have Songs From The Red Room, and a 51-year-old woman raging brilliantly against the dying of the light."

Singles 
"Bitter Pill" was released as the album's first single in October 2002 under Fahey's own name. It was her first and only release with record label God Made Me Hardcore. The next single, "Pulsatron", was released in February 2005 through Fahey's own label, SF Records. The album version, aka the Whitey Mix, differs from the single version in that it is slightly re-arranged and omits the chorus. "Bad Blood" was released as the album's third single in October 2005, again under Fahey's own name. "It's a Trip" was released in April 2010 to promote the release of the deluxe edition of the album, this time under the name Shakespears Sister. Technically, this was the first Shakespears Sister single in 14 years.

The Red Room Sessions
In March 2011, The Red Room Sessions EP was released exclusively on digital format through their website. The six-track EP consists of demos and alternate versions of songs from Songs from the Red Room and an original song "Ned", which was later included on Cosmic Dancer.

Track listing

Personnel 
 Additional production – William Blanchard, Clare Kenny
 Engineering and programming – Stephen 'Gully' Gallifent
 Digital mastering – Alex Tomlin
 Vocals, guitar, keyboards – Siobhan Fahey
 Programming, guitars, keyboards, backing vocals, bass – Stephen 'Gully' Gallifent
 Bass, backing vocals, guitars, keyboards – Clare Kenny
 Drums, keyboards, percussion, guitars – Will Blanchard
 Guitar, bass, programming (track 1) – Nathan J. Whitey
 Vocals (track 3) – Terry Hall
 Vocals (track 4) – James SK Wān
 Additional guitars (tracks 4 and 8) – Marco Pirroni

References 

2009 albums
Shakespears Sister albums